Prime9 News is an Indian Telugu language 24-hour television news channel. The channel is promoted by Samhitha Broadcasting Pvt. Ltd. Its head office is in Hyderabad. The channel launched in October 2018 with a test run.

History 
Prime9 News is an Indian satellite television news channel that provides 24-hour news coverage in Telugu. It launched with a test run using RTV license in October 2018.

Programming
The channel coverage includes live news, news bulletins, current affairs, talk shows. It broadcasts regional, national and international news.

Availability
It is available in Intelsat 17, 66.0°E 3876, horizontal with symbol rate - 14300 3/4, System DVB-S28PSKMPEG-4.

See also
 List of Telugu-language television channels

References

External links
 

Telugu-language television channels
24-hour television news channels in India
Television channels and stations established in 2018
Television stations in Hyderabad